Hendecaneura himalayana is a species of moth of the family Tortricidae. It is found in China (Tibet), India and Nepal.

References

Moths described in 1996
Eucosmini